Yigal Arnon (December 9, 1929 in Tel Aviv – April 27, 2014) was an Israeli lawyer and founder of Yigal Arnon & Co.

Biography
Yigal Arnon received his LL.M. degree from the Hebrew University of Jerusalem in 1953, and was admitted to the Israel Bar in 1954. On the Israeli Friends of the Hebrew University of Jerusalem web site, he is described as one of the leading jurists in Israel.

Legal career
He served as the chairman of the First International Bank of Israel, the fifth largest bank in Israel, between 1987 and 2000, followed by becoming Chairman of F.I.B.I Holdings Ltd.; Chairman of the Board of Governors of the Hebrew University; and Chairman of Arkia Israel Airlines, the second largest airliner in Israel, of which he was reported to own almost 20%.

Arnon was known to represent the Safra brothers' Israeli interests and has represented Ehud Olmert and Aryeh Deri in the past.

References

Further reading

External links
Hebrew U. alumni bio
Yigal Arnon & Co.
Law firm bio

1929 births
2014 deaths
Israeli Jews
Israeli lawyers
Law firm founders
Hebrew University of Jerusalem Faculty of Law alumni